Thundersqueak Records is a British independent record label that was founded in Blackpool, England, in 2002 initially for the sole purpose of releasing records by the band Uncle Fester. The label's name is taken from the title of the book by Liz Angerford, Ambrose Lea and Ramsey Dukes.

In 2014, the label significantly expanded its roster of artists, acquiring and releasing recordings made by artists from the northwest of England over the preceding 30 years. During the period February to April 2014 alone, the label issued over 30 albums by 10 bands and artists, encompassing disparate genres from classical music and dixieland to punk rock and synthpop.

In May 2014, Thundersqueak began an extensive re-release programme of rare 1950s rockabilly, rock and roll and doo wop on the series of compilation albums, Rockabilly Rock and Roll Nuggets, Volumes 1-26 - The Rare, the Rarer and the Rarest Rockers and Doo Wop Nuggets Volumes 1-4 - lost vocal groups of the fifties - The rare, The rarer and the rarest of Doo Wop.

Thundersqueak artists
 The Alien Brain
 Another Dimension
 Beaver
 Bill Swing
 Brain One
 The Clapton Cooder Project
 The Crawlin' Hex
 Duncan Jowitt
 Final Solution
 Gothic Philharmonic
 Les Moore's French Quarter Band
 Lucifer
 Lynch Twins
 Mockingbone
 Shining Sons
 The Skull Cowboy
 Somewhere in England
 The Synthesizer
 UFX
 Zoo Boutique

References

Record labels established in 2002
British record labels
Pop record labels
Garage rock record labels
Punk record labels
Rock and roll record labels
Classical music record labels
British country music record labels